Switched On is the sixth solo extended play by Canadian rapper Madchild. It was released on September 30, 2014 via Battle Axe Records. Recording sessions took place at the Chamber Studios in Nanaimo, British Columbia. Production was handled by C-Lance, Aspect, Rob The Viking, Chin Injeti and Community Music Group. It features guest appearance from Sophia Danai. The album peaked at number eight on the Canadian Albums Chart.

Track listing

Personnel
Shane "Madchild" Bunting – main artist, executive producer
Sophia Danai – featured artist (track 8)
Robin "Rob the Viking" Hooper – producer (tracks: 1, 3, 9, 15), arranger, recording, mixing (tracks: 1-9)
Craig "C-Lance" Lanciani – producer (tracks: 2, 4, 6, 10)
Aspect – producer (tracks: 5, 7, 11-14, 16, 18, 19)
Pranam "Chin" Injeti – producer (track 8)
Jimi Dali – producer (track 17)
Rob Whalen – producer (track 17)
Mike Kumagai – mixing (tracks: 10-13, 15-18)
Roger Swan – mixing (track 14)
Tom Baker – mastering
Ivory Daniel – executive producer, management
Kevin Zinger – executive producer, management
Ryan Lindow – photography
Alex Rauch – design
Rakaa Taylor – booking
Zach Johnson – booking

Charts

References

2014 EPs
Madchild albums